The Republic of Morac-Songhrati-Meads was a micronation in the Spratly Islands established by British naval captain James George Meads in 1877.

History
The republic's history begins with Captain Meads, who laid claim to the Spratly Islands in 1877. Meads was exploring the South China Sea and laid claim to the islands and took the name King James I. Descendants of Meads have continued to posit legitimacy over the islands, and ownership of the islands' resources.

Kingdom of Humanity

A rival entity called the "Kingdom of Humanity" formed in 1914 under the leadership of Franklin M. Meads, the son of James George. The two rival factions continued their claim on the islands during World War II, when they were occupied by Japanese troops. Franklin died in 1945, and his son Josiah took over leadership ; Josiah himself died soon after. His son, Morton F. Meads, was to succeed but was deemed too young.

Legal attempts at legitimacy
The Kingdom faded into obscurity over the next decade until 1972, when the then-ruling Morton Meads unsuccessfully petitioned the United Nations, Chiang Kai-shek of the Republic of China, and the Philippines to recognise the Kingdom and its claims. Later that year, the remainder of the Kingdom's governing body drowned in a shipwreck off the coast of Philippines during Typhoon Ora, except for Meads.

The Kingdom reappeared in 1985  when Meads sued the United States and others for $25 billion, claiming "unfair competition, harassment, [and] sabotage." The case was not heard.

See also
Spratly Islands

References

Further reading
 Samuel Pyeatt Menefee, "Republics of the Reefs: Nation-Building on the Continental Shelf and in the World's Oceans", California Western International Law Journal, vol. 25, no. 1, Fall, 1994, pp. 83–85.

Micronations
History of the Spratly Islands
States and territories established in the 1870s
Former unrecognized countries